San Miguel is a census-designated place in Pima County, in the U.S. state of Arizona. The population was 207 as of the 2020 census. San Miguel is located near the border with Mexico on the Tohono O'odham Nation reservation.

Demographics

At the 2020 census there were 207 people, 59 households, and 43 families living in the CDP.  The population density was 37 people per square mile. There were 82 housing units.

The median household income was $22,106. The per capita income for the CDP was $11,430.

References

Census-designated places in Pima County, Arizona
Tohono O'odham Nation